Mojtaba Mirzajanpour Muziraji (born 7 October 1991) is an Iranian volleyball player, a member of the Iran national team and Iranian Volleyball Super League club Shahrdari Varamin. He competed at the 2014 World Championship and Rio 2016 Summer Olympics.
Mirzajanpour debut national game in 2013 Grand Championship did with invitations Julio Velasco.

Career

Personal life
He is married to Niloufar Ebrahimi. She is also a volleyball player who plays for Sarmayeh Bank VC.

Honours

National team
World Grand Champions Cup
Bronze medal (1): 2017
Asian Games
Gold medal (1): 2014
U19 World Championship
Silver medal (1): 2009

Club
Asian Championship
Gold medal (2): 2014 (Matin), 2017 (Sarmayeh Bank)
Iranian Super League
Champions (4): 2011 (Paykan), 2014 (Matin), 2015 (Paykan), 2018 (Sarmayeh Bank)

References

1991 births
Living people
Iranian men's volleyball players
People from Babol
Asian Games gold medalists for Iran
Asian Games medalists in volleyball
Volleyball players at the 2014 Asian Games
Olympic volleyball players of Iran
Volleyball players at the 2016 Summer Olympics
Medalists at the 2014 Asian Games
Iranian expatriate sportspeople in Italy
Sportspeople from Mazandaran province
21st-century Iranian people